Strongylopus kitumbeine (common name: Kitumbeine stream frog) is a species of frogs in the family Pyxicephalidae. It is endemic to Tanzania and only known from its type locality, Mount Kitumbeine.

It survives also in heavily disturbed forest. Breeding takes place in open water. While it is common within its small range, it has been assessed as being "Vulnerable" because of threats from livestock grazing and fire in combination with the small range.

References

Strongylopus
Endemic fauna of Tanzania
Amphibians of Tanzania
Frogs of Africa
Amphibians described in 2002
Taxonomy articles created by Polbot